Lulesia is a genus of fungi in the family Tricholomataceae. The genus contains three species found in tropical regions.

See also

List of Tricholomataceae genera

References

Tricholomataceae
Agaricales genera
Taxa named by Rolf Singer